Joseph Gbode (born 8 April 2004) is an English professional footballer who plays as a forward for  club Gillingham.

Career
Gbode made his first-team debut for Gillingham on 16 November 2021, coming on as a 62nd-minute substitute for Ben Reeves in a 1–0 defeat at Cheltenham Town in the FA Cup. On 4 February 2022, he joined Margate on a one-month loan deal. On 24 March 2022, he joined Folkestone Invicta on loan, alongside Gillingham teammates Sam Gale and Alex Giles. He joined Hastings United on dual-registration terms at the start of the 2022–23 season.

Career statistics

References

2004 births
Living people
Footballers from Southwark
English footballers
Association football forwards
Gillingham F.C. players
Margate F.C. players
Folkestone Invicta F.C. players
Hastings United F.C. players
English Football League players
Isthmian League players
Black British sportspeople